Raoul Louis Heertje (born 11 March 1963, in Bussum) is a Dutch comedian. Being Jewish himself, his comedy performances include Jewish humour.

Biography
From 1983 till 1984 Heertje studied International Relations and Theatre Studies at the Hebrew University of Jerusalem. After that he studied in Birmingham till 1986.

The notable international appearances he made were in the TV shows of Ruby Wax, Clive James, Jeremy Clarkson and in the British satirical programme Have I Got News for You (on series 9) in 1995. A year later he became a panelist in the successful Dutch version of the same show: Dit was het nieuws.

Raoul, and his brother Eric, founded comedyclub Toomler and Comedytrain, the stand-up comedy collective that introduced stand-up comedy in the Netherlands in the year 1990. In 2007 he is one of the members of The Amsterdam Underground Comedy Collective.

Heertje also wrote columns voor Het Parool.

His father is the economist Arnold Heertje.

Comedytrain
Comedytrain was the first stand-up comedy collective in the Netherlands. It was founded in 1990 by Raoul Heertje. Comedy club Toomler in Amsterdam is its home theatre.

The word Comedytrain is a combination of comedy and training. Its main goal was to give talented comedians, who did not succeed at once in making an hour and a half one-man show, a place to perform and develop, to try out, fail and succeed; to evaluate others and be evaluated by them.

Over the years Comedytrain has become the home of famous Dutch comedians, like Hans Teeuwen, Theo Maassen, Najib Amhali, Hans Sibbel, Thomas Acda, Ronald Goedemondt, Jan Jaap van der Wal, and Sanne Wallis de Vries.

Comedytrain is still a place where young comedians find a stage for developing as performers. Twice a year auditions are held for new talents to enter Comedytrain. The comedians do not only play the Toomler stage weekly, but also tour the Dutch theatres together, perform for companies and parties and play the many stages in theatre café's and bars all over the country.

References

External links 
 
 Official site
 

1963 births
Living people
Dutch Ashkenazi Jews
Dutch columnists
Dutch stand-up comedians
Jewish Dutch comedians
Jewish Dutch writers
People from Bussum
Secular Jews